John McPherson  was a Scottish footballer who played as a forward.

Career
McPherson played club football for Clydesdale. He scored the first hat-trick in the Scottish Cup during Clydesdale's 6–0 victory over Granville on 25 October 1873.

McPherson also made one appearance for Scotland in 1875.

References

Year of birth missing
Place of birth missing
Scottish footballers
Scotland international footballers
Clydesdale F.C. players
Association football forwards
Year of death missing
Place of death missing